Theodore Pollock Ferguson (January 10, 1853 – July 12, 1920) was a pioneer leader in the American Holiness Movement, a Christian evangelist and social worker who co-founded the Peniel Mission and Peniel Missionary Society.

Ferguson was born on January 10, 1853, in Mansfield, Ohio, in Richland County, Ohio. He was converted in 1875 in Oberlin, Ohio, through the preaching of evangelist Charles Finney. He became a minister in the United Presbyterian church. In 1879 he relocated to Santa Barbara, California. In 1880 he was entirely sanctified during a holiness revival meeting in California. He became an itinerant preacher. On June 7, 1883, he married Manie Payne Ferguson. They moved to Los Angeles, California, during the boom of 1885–86. On 11 November 1886 they founded the Los Angeles Mission, later named the Peniel Mission.

Ferguson died on 12 July 1920 in Los Angeles.

References
'Notes

Bibliography

Further reading
Bangs, Carl. Phineas F. Bresee: His Life in Methodism, the Holiness Movement, and the Church of the Nazarene (1995). Includes a chapter that discusses Bresee's involvement in the Peniel Mission in Los Angeles and profiles other principal leaders involved in the mission's founding and development, including the Fergusons and G. B. Studd.
Bartleman, Frank. "How Pentecost Came to Los Angeles. Los Angeles, 1925. Republished as "Asuza Street".
Cox, Mabel Holmes. The Lady Pioneer: Pioneer Missionary Work in Alaska and the Northwest. Roseburg, Ore.: n.p., 1968. Autobiography of Peniel Mission missionary who served at several different sites. Includes photographs, including ones of Mr. and Mrs. T. P. Ferguson, founders of the Peniel Mission.
Darling, Olive M., compiler. Converts of Peniel Missions, n.p., n.d.
Ferguson, Manie Payne. T.P. Ferguson: The Love Slave of Jesus Christ and His People and Founder of Peniel Missions (c. 1920). 240 pages. Includes a photo of T.P. Ferguson (page 17), biography of the life of T.P. Ferguson, notes from T. P. Ferguson's diary for 1881-1882 (pages 95–103), Bible readings and notes by T. P. Ferguson (pages 107–219), Peniel Missionary Work (pages 220–38), and an update of "Peniel Missionary Work" (page 239).
Hittson, Paul A. History of Peniel Missions. 1975.
Holland, Clifton L., comp. An Overview of Religion in Los Angeles from 1850 to 1930. 
Jones, Charles Edwin. Perfectionist Persuasion: The Holiness Movement and American Methodism, 1867–1936. Metuchen, NJ: Scarecrow Press, 1974. Section on the Peniel Mission pages 69–77.
Lewis, James R., ed. The Encyclopedia of Cults, Sects, and New Religions. 2nd ed. Prometheus Books, 2001. See page 561 for encyclopedic article about the Peniel Missions and the Fergusons.
Melton, J. Gordon, editor. The Encyclopedia of American Religions: Vol. 1. Tarrytown, NY: Triumph Books, 1991. Chapter: Holiness Family; section: 19th Century Holiness; pg. 214 for article regarding the Peniel Missions and the Fergusons.
Peniel Herald. Official organ of the Peniel Mission.
Piepkorn, Arthur Carl. Profiles in Belief: The Religious Bodies of the United States and Canada. Harper Collins, 1978. See page 7 for Bresee's involvement in the Peniel Mission.
Pounds, Michael E. “The Beginning Days.” Peniel Herald, Number 5, 1986. Concerns the Peniel Missions and the work of T. P. and Manie Ferguson. Reference to Haldor Lillenas.
Schwanz, Keith. Satisfied: Women Hymn Writers of the 19th-century Wesleyan/Holiness movement. Wesleyan/Holiness Women Clergy, Inc, 1998.  Gives a brief biography of Manie Ferguson.
Smith, Timothy. Called Unto Holiness: The Story of the Nazarenes. Kansas City, Missouri: Nazarene, 1962. See pages 49 and following for involvement of Bresee and Widney in the Peniel Mission.
Taiz, Lillian. Hallelujah Lads and Lasses: Remaking the Salvation Army in America, 1880–1930. University of North Carolina Press, 2000.
"The Year in Review at the Los Angeles Mission, 1990." The Los Angeles Mission is the reorganized Peniel Mission.
Wacker, Grant. Heaven Below: Early Pentecostals and American Culture. Harvard University Press, 2003. See page 204 for GB Studd's contribution to the Peniel Hall.
Wood, John Windell. Pasadena, California, historical and personal;: A complete history of the organization of the Indiana colony, its establishment on the Rancho San Pascual ... Churches, societies, homes, etc. John W Wood, 1917. See page 326 for description of the Peniel Mission.

1853 births
1920 deaths
American Presbyterian ministers
People from Mansfield, Ohio